Buchler is a German surname.  Notable people with the surname include:

Johnny Buchler (born 1930), South African rugby union player
Justus Buchler (1914–1991), American philosopher, author and professor
Samuel Buchler (1882–1971), President of the Federation of Hungarian Jews in America

See also
Büchler

German-language surnames